The tenth series of Made in Chelsea, a British structured-reality television programme, began airing on 19 October 2015 on E4. The official trailer for the new series was released on 29 September 2015 confirming the start date. It concluded on 4 January 2016 following nine regular episodes, a Christmas special, a New Year special, and an End of Season party hosted by Rick Edwards. This series was the first to include new cast members Emma Walsh, Lily Ludovici Gray, Sam Harney and Tallulah Rufus Isaacs. Richard Dinan also returned to the series having last appeared during the fifth series, and Francis Boulle made a one-off return during the Christmas special. This was also the final series to include original cast member Spencer Matthews, long-running cast member Oliver Proudlock, as well as Millie Wilkinson and Emily Weller, who both made their debuts during the ninth series. The series focused heavily on Sam and Tiff's rocky relationship coming to an end when Tiff admits to cheating on him during the summer and rumours of Sam cheating surface, until the pair eventually reunite.

Cast

Episodes

{| class="wikitable plainrowheaders" style="width:100%; background:#fff;"
! style="background:#2EFEC8;"| Seriesno.
! style="background:#2EFEC8;"| Episodeno.
! style="background:#2EFEC8;"| Title
! style="background:#2EFEC8;"| Original air date
! style="background:#2EFEC8;"| Duration
! style="background:#2EFEC8;"| UK viewers

|}

Ratings

External links

References

2015 British television seasons
2016 British television seasons
Made in Chelsea seasons